Clarence Everett "Yam" Yaryan (November 5, 1892 – November 16, 1964) was a professional baseball player. Yaryan played two seasons in Major League Baseball for the Chicago White Sox in 1921 and 1922, primarily as a catcher. He batted and threw right-handed.

Yaryan was born in Knowlton, Ringgold County, Iowa and died in Birmingham, Alabama.

External links

Baseball-Almanac page

Major League Baseball catchers
Chicago White Sox players
Wichita Witches players
Wichita Jobbers players
Toledo Mud Hens players
Seattle Indians players
Memphis Chickasaws players
Birmingham Barons players
Fort Worth Panthers players
Baton Rouge Standards players
Chattanooga Lookouts players
York White Roses players
New Haven Bulldogs players
Andalusia Reds players
Andalusia Bulldogs players
Easton Yankees players
Gadsden Pilots players
Anniston Rams players
Brewton Millers players
Baseball players from Iowa
People from Ringgold County, Iowa
1892 births
1964 deaths